Samuel Egadu (born June 3, 1988 in Tororo) is a Ugandan sprinter. He competed for Uganda at the 2006 Commonwealth Games.

External links
 

1988 births
Living people
Ugandan male sprinters
Athletes (track and field) at the 2006 Commonwealth Games
People from Tororo District
Commonwealth Games competitors for Uganda
21st-century Ugandan people